Óscar Darío Guerrero Alvarado (born 1 March 1985), known as Óscar Guerrero, is a Colombian professional footballer, who plays as a forward for Vittoriosa Stars in Malta.

Personal life
Óscar Guerrero is the first children from Janés Guerrero and Lilia Alvarado. His family settled in Bogotá, where he began playing youth football in Academia Compensar, at age 12.

Guerrero made his professional debut in 2005, in the Categoría Primera B with Academia.

Ahead of the 2019-20 season, Guerrero returned to Maltese club Vittoriosa Stars.

References

1985 births
Living people
Colombian footballers
Colombia international footballers
Colombian expatriate footballers
Academia F.C. players
Atlético Bucaramanga footballers
FC Pyunik players
Deportivo Armenio footballers
Cortuluá footballers
Hapoel Nir Ramat HaSharon F.C. players
Hapoel Jerusalem F.C. players
Maccabi Petah Tikva F.C. players
Vittoriosa Stars F.C. players
Balzan F.C. players
Alianza F.C. footballers
Leones Negros UdeG footballers
Potros UAEM footballers
AEL Limassol players
Għajnsielem F.C. players
Categoría Primera A players
Israeli Premier League players
Liga Leumit players
Ascenso MX players
Maltese Premier League players
Cypriot First Division players
Primera División de Fútbol Profesional players
Colombian expatriate sportspeople in Israel
Colombian expatriate sportspeople in Malta
Colombian expatriate sportspeople in El Salvador
Colombian expatriate sportspeople in Cyprus
Expatriate footballers in Armenia
Expatriate footballers in Israel
Expatriate footballers in Malta
Expatriate footballers in El Salvador
Expatriate footballers in Cyprus
Association football forwards
Footballers from Bogotá